Year 227 (CCXXVII) was a common year starting on Monday (link will display the full calendar) of the Julian calendar. At the time, it was known as the Year of the Consulship of Senecio and Fulvius (or, less frequently, year 980 Ab urbe condita). The denomination 227 for this year has been used since the early medieval period, when the Anno Domini calendar era became the prevalent method in Europe for naming years.

Events

By place

Roman Empire 
 Seius Sallustius is executed for the attempted murder of his son-in-law, Emperor Alexander Severus. Sallustius' daughter, as well as Alexander's wife, Sallustia Orbiana, is exiled to Libya.

Ireland 
 The rule of High King Cormac mac Airt begins (approximate).

Persian Empire 
 King Ardashir I annexes his new empire from the east to the northwest. He conquers, with his army, the provinces of Chorasmia, Sistan and the island Bahrain in the Persian Gulf. The kings of the Kushan Empire and Turan recognize Ardashir as their overlord.

Asia 
 Dongcheon becomes ruler over the Korean kingdom of Goguryeo.
</onlyinclude>

Births 
 Herennius Etruscus, Roman emperor (d. 251)
 Sima Zhou, Chinese prince and general (d. 283)
 Zhuge Zhan, Chinese general and official (d. 263)

Deaths 
 Han Dang (or Yigong), Chinese general 
 He Qi (or Gongmiao), Chinese general
 Seius Sallustius, Roman usurper (Caesar)
 Shi Hui, Chinese official and general (b. 165)
 Xu Huang (or Gongming), Chinese general

References